The first world record in the 100 metres sprint for women was recognised by the Fédération Sportive Féminine Internationale (FSFI) in 1922. The FSFI was absorbed by the International Association of Athletics Federations (IAAF) in 1936. The current record is 10.49 seconds set by Florence Griffith-Joyner in 1988.

To June 21, 2009, the IAAF (and the FSFI before it) have ratified 43 world records in the event.

Records 1922–1976

The "Time" column indicates the ratified mark; the "Wind" column indicates the wind assistance in metres per second, 2.0 m/s the current maximum allowable, a negative indicates the mark was set running into a wind; the "Auto" column indicates a fully automatic time that was also recorded in the event when hand-timed marks were used for official records, or which was the basis for the official mark, rounded to the 10th or 100th of a second, depending on the rules then in place. A "y" indicates a distance measured in yards and ratified as a world record in this event.

Records from 1975
From 1975, the IAAF accepted separate automatically electronically timed records for events up to 400 metres. Starting January 1, 1977, the IAAF required fully automatic timing to the hundredth of a second for these events.

Wyomia Tyus's 1968 Olympic gold medal performance and Renate Stecher's 1972 Olympic championship win, both in 11.07, were the fastest recorded fully electronic 100-metre races to that time and were ratified as world records. However, Tyus's 11.07 was later adjusted to 11.08.

*There is controversy over Griffith-Joyner's world record as questions have been raised as to whether the wind actually was zero, as indicated by the trackside anemometer. The triple-jump anemometer, some 10 metres away, read 4.3 m/s, more than double the acceptable limit. Despite the controversy, the record was ratified by the IAAF. 

Had this mark been ignored, the progression would have continued as follows:

See also
Men's 100 metres world record progression
Sprints

Notes

References

100, women
100 metres

id:Rekor dunia lari 100 meter#Putri